Casuaria excissimalis is a species of snout moth in the genus Casuaria. It was described by Harrison Gray Dyar Jr. in 1923, and is known from Mexico.

References

Moths described in 1923
Chrysauginae